Korea Expressway Corporation (Hangul: 한국도로공사) is a South Korean corporation running the toll roads of South Korea.

Timeline 

 1968 – Started construction of Gyeongbu Expressway
 1969 – KEC founded (capital stock of 50billion won)
 1970 – Opened whole section of 428 km Gyeongbu Expressway
 1973 – Opened the era of 1,000 km Expressway network
 1973 – Established a Survey Institute (Currently Transport Research Institute)
 1978 – Daily number of vehicles using expressways surpassed 100,000
 1980 – Launched integrated tolling system
 1984 – Opened a traffic information broadcasting studio
 1987 – Total length of expressway exceed 1,500 km
 1988 – Daily toll revenue surpassed 1 billion won
 1990 – Total assets exceeded 1 trillion Korea won
 1994 – Mechanized toll collection system (TCS) at all toll gates
 1994 – Total assets surpassed 5 trillion won
 1994 – Introduced the first bus-only lane
 1997 – Built nationwide independent communications network
 1999 – Started Hi-Pass pilot project
 1999 – Opened the era of 2,000 km Expressway network
 2001 – Opened 423.2 km expressways
 2003 – Arranged foreign capital at low interest rates (US$500mil, 10year maturity)
 2007 – Expanded Hi-Pass service to nationwide
 2007 – Total length of expressways exceed 3,000 km
 2010 – Rate of Hi-Pass use surpassed 50% and number of Hi-Pass users surpassed 5 million
 2012 – Opened the era of 4,000 km Expressway network

See also 
 Expressways in South Korea

References

External links 
 Official website
 Former website

Toll road operators
Transport operators of South Korea
Road transport in South Korea
Government-owned companies of South Korea
Transport companies established in 1969
South Korean companies established in 1969
Companies based in North Gyeongsang Province
Gimcheon